Timo Roosen (born 11 January 1993) is a Dutch cyclist, who currently rides for UCI WorldTeam . He was named in the start list for the 2015 Vuelta a España and the start list for the 2016 Tour de France. In 2021, he won the Dutch National Road Race Championships.

Major results

2011
 1st Stage 3 Sint-Martinusprijs Kontich
2013
 1st Stage 1 Tour de Berlin
2014
 1st  Sprints classification Ster ZLM Toer
 2nd Overall Kreiz Breizh Elites
1st  Young rider classification
1st Stage 3
 5th Omloop der Kempen
 6th Overall Olympia's Tour
 10th Paris–Tours Espoirs
2015
 7th Ronde van Zeeland Seaports
2017
 1st Tacx Pro Classic
 3rd Overall Tour des Fjords
1st Stage 2
 7th Grote Prijs Stad Zottegem
2018
 4th Road race, National Road Championships
 4th Grand Prix Cycliste de Québec
 5th Grand Prix Cycliste de Montréal
 6th Overall Tour des Fjords
 7th Overall Dubai Tour
2019
 2nd Kampioenschap van Vlaanderen
 3rd Famenne Ardenne Classic
 4th Binche–Chimay–Binche
 8th Grand Prix Cycliste de Québec
2020
 3rd Road race, National Road Championships
 7th Dwars door het Hageland
 8th Gooikse Pijl
2021
 1st  Road race, National Road Championships
2022
 1st Stage 2 Vuelta a Burgos
 4th Ronde van Drenthe

Grand Tour general classification results timeline

References

External links

1993 births
Living people
Dutch male cyclists
Sportspeople from Tilburg
Cyclists from North Brabant